Bandrani is a village on the island of Anjouan in the Comoros. According to the 1991 census the village had a population of 760. The current estimate for 2009 is 1,339 people

References

Populated places in Anjouan